Klas Eriksson (born 30 July 1971) is a Swedish professional golfer.

Eriksson was born in Växjö and turned professional in 1991 having won the European Amateur and the French Amateur Stoke Play Championship the previous year. He finished 45th on the Order of Merit in his rookie season, but injuries and putting problems meant he failed to retain his card at the end of the 1998 season and he was back on the Challenge Tour in 1999.

Eriksson graduated from the Challenge Tour for a second time in 2001 by finishing 7th on the Rankings having won for the fourth time on the tour at the Talma Finnish Challenge. He maintained his playing status on the European Tour for four seasons before again returning to the Challenge Tour. In 2008 he won his fifth Challenge Tour title at the Trophée du Golf Club de Genève as he secured promotion to the top level for the third time. In 2009 he again failed to win sufficient money to retain his European Tour card and was back on the Challenge Tour in 2010.

On 30 October 1994, Eriksson achieved a highest world ranking of 226.

Amateur wins
1990 European Amateur, French Amateur Open Stroke Play Championship

Professional wins (2)

Challenge Tour wins (2)

Challenge Tour playoff record (1–1)

Results in major championships

Note: Eriksson only played in The Open Championship.

CUT = missed the half-way cut
"T" = tied

Team appearances
Amateur
Eisenhower Trophy (representing Sweden): 1990 (winners)
St Andrews Trophy (representing the Continent of Europe): 1990
European Amateur Team Championship (representing Sweden): 1991

See also
2008 Challenge Tour graduates
List of golfers with most Challenge Tour wins

References

External links

Swedish male golfers
European Tour golfers
Sportspeople from Kronoberg County
People from Växjö
1971 births
Living people